The Filipino records in swimming are the fastest ever performances of swimmers from Philippines, which are recognised and ratified by the Philippine Swimming.

All records were set in finals unless noted otherwise.

Long Course (50 m)

Men

Women

Mixed relay

Short Course (25 m)

Men

Women

Mixed relay

References

Filipino
Records
Swimming
Swimming